Metropolitan Cornelius of Petra (né Emmanuel Rodousakis) is a senior bishop of the Eastern Orthodox Patriarchate of Jerusalem. He was locum tenens of the Church in 2001, following the death of Patriarch Diodoros I. He served as locum tenens again from 30 May 2005, after the deposition of Irenaios I on 6 May, until the election of Theophilos III on 22 August.

Biography
He was born in 1936 in Magarikario of Herakleion, Crete. 

He arrived in Jerusalem in 1951. 

He graduated from the Patriarchal School of Jerusalem, and was tonsured a monk in 1958 and ordained to the diaconate the following year. He studied theology at the Theological School in Halki, Turkey. He was ordained to the priesthood in 1964, and elevated to the rank of archimandrite in 1965. In 1967, he continued his education at the Ecumenical Institute of Geneva and, in 1972, he was made a member of the Holy Synod of the Eastern Orthodox Patriarchate of Jerusalem.

He served as archivist and principal of the Patriarchal School, also serving as editor and director of the New Zion magazine and chairman of Education. In October 1976, he was elected to the episcopacy and consecrated Archdiocesan of Sevasteia. On July 2, 1978, he was appointed Patriarchal Commissioner for Bethlehem, and in 1981, he was appointed Chairman of the School Inspectorate. In 1991, he was elected Eparch of Sevasteia and, in 1998, Eparch of Petra.

He served as a suffragan bishop of the Patriarch. In 2001, he was appointed General Patriarchal Commissioner. Representing the Jerusalem Patriarchate, he has also participated in various conventions and missions.

References

1936 births
Living people
Eastern Orthodox metropolitans
Bishops of the Greek Orthodox Church of Jerusalem
Eastern Orthodox Christians from Greece
Religious leaders from Crete
Theological School of Halki alumni
People from Heraklion (regional unit)